Skottgränd (Swedish: "Scotch Alley") is an alley in Gamla stan, the old town of Stockholm Sweden, stretching from Skeppsbron to Österlånggatan.

 Old names  Skottegrändenn (1597), østan till Skåttegrändhenn (1606)

Apparently the name came into use by the end of the 16th century. It reflects the immigration of Scots, Englishmen and Dutch people who settled in the alley and were, arguably, collectively referred to as 'Scots'. Possibly, the name might refer to the name of an individual, even though the records do not give any details about it.

 Parallel streets  Brunnsgränd, Stora Hoparegränd
 Crossing streets  Skeppsbron, Österlånggatan

See also 
 List of streets and squares in Gamla stan

References

External links 
 hitta.se - Location map and virtual walk

Streets in Stockholm